Malang Mamadou William Georges Sarr (born 23 January 1999) is a French professional footballer who plays as a defender for Ligue 1 club Monaco, on loan from Chelsea. He has also represented France at youth international level. An academy graduate of Nice, Sarr scored on his senior debut in 2016 and made over 100 appearances for the club.

Early life
Sarr was born in Nice, Alpes-Maritimes.

Club career

Nice
Sarr joined local side OGC Nice at the age of six. He spent the next 12 years in the club's academy before making his Ligue 1 debut for the club on 14 August 2016 against Rennes, aged 17. He scored the winning goal for his team in the 60th minute, heading home from a Jean Michaël Seri free-kick. In doing so, he became the second youngest player to ever score on debut in Ligue 1, behind Nigerian international Bartholomew Ogbeche. After the match, Sarr dedicated his goal to the victims of the 2016 Nice terror attack. Prior to kick-off a minute's silence was observed in memory of the victims with both Nice and Rennes wearing unique commemorative shirts bearing the names of those who had died. On 7 November 2016, Sarr signed his first professional contract with Nice and by the end of the season had made over 30 appearances as the club ended the league campaign in third place.

In February 2018, Sarr was named by the CIES Football Observatory as the world's fifth-most promising footballer under the age of 20. Competing with Maxime Le Marchand and new loan signing Marlon, Sarr saw his game time slightly reduced but still managed to record 29 appearances across all competitions for the campaign.

On 10 August 2019, the opening day of the 2019–20 Ligue 1 campaign, Sarr made his 100th appearance for Nice across all competitions when he started in a 2–1 win over Amiens. His contract expired on 30 June 2020 and subsequently became a free agent.

Chelsea
On 27 August 2020, Chelsea announced the signing of Sarr on a five-year deal.

2020–21 season: Loan to Porto
On 6 October 2020, Sarr joined the Portuguese side Porto on loan for the rest of the 2020–21 season. On 21 October 2020, Sarr made his Porto debut during their UEFA Champions League group stage tie with Manchester City, featuring for 80 minutes before being replaced by Evanilson in the 3–1 away defeat. Sarr went onto score his only goal for the club in a Taça da Liga tie against Paços de Ferreira in December 2020, netting the opener in their 2–1 victory. Sarr went onto feature 19 times in all competitions for the Dragões before returning to Chelsea ahead of the 2021–22 campaign.

2021–22 season: Return from loan

Following proposed loan moves to Germany, Italy and France reportedly collapsing, Sarr opted to stay at Chelsea and was subsequently given the number 31 jersey for the forthcoming 2021–22 campaign. On 22 September 2021, Sarr made his Chelsea debut during a 1–1 draw in the EFL Cup against Aston Villa, featuring for the full 90 minutes as the Blues progressed to the fourth round following a 4–3 penalty shootout victory. A month later, he made his Premier League debut against newly-promoted Brentford due to the unavailability of Antonio Rüdiger and Thiago Silva, playing the full 90 minutes and keeping a clean sheet during the 1–0 victory.

In January 2022, he started at left-back against Tottenham in the EFL Cup semi-final. It was the start of an extended run in the first-team for Sarr.

On 12 February 2022, Sarr was an extra-time substitute as Chelsea won the 2021 FIFA Club World Cup title, beating Palmeiras. He was also a substitute in the semi-final game against Al-Hilal.

2022–23 season: Loan to Monaco
On 10 August 2022, Sarr joined Monaco on a season-long loan deal, with an option to buy.

International career
Sarr has represented France at various youth levels and in September 2016, Sarr was named as the captain of the 20-man France U18 squad by manager Bernard Diomède for the 2016 Limoges Tournament. In 2018, he confirmed that he had been approached by the Senegalese Football Association to represent the nation but stated that he had hoped to achieve greater things with France.

Personal life
Sarr was born in the neighbourhood of les Moulins in Nice. He is of Senegalese descent through his parents who immigrated to France prior to his birth.

Sarr is a Muslim.

Career statistics

Honours
Chelsea
FIFA Club World Cup: 2021
FA Cup runner-up: 2021–22
EFL Cup runner-up: 2021–22

References

External links

Profile at the Chelsea F.C. website

1999 births
Living people
Footballers from Nice
French footballers
Association football defenders
OGC Nice players
Chelsea F.C. players
FC Porto players
FC Porto B players
AS Monaco FC players
Ligue 1 players
Primeira Liga players
Liga Portugal 2 players
Premier League players
France youth international footballers
France under-21 international footballers
French expatriate footballers
Expatriate footballers in England
Expatriate footballers in Portugal
French expatriate sportspeople in England
French expatriate sportspeople in Portugal
Black French sportspeople
French sportspeople of Senegalese descent